Southport Ash Street was a railway station in Southport, Lancashire, England.

History
It opened as Southport Windsor Road on 10 June 1878 as the temporary terminus of the West Lancashire Railway from Preston.

On 5 September 1882 a permanent terminus was opened at Southport Central.

From 1 November 1887 the Liverpool, Southport and Preston Junction Railway to Altcar and Hillhouse also ran through Southport Ash Street.

In July 1897, both lines were absorbed into the Lancashire and Yorkshire Railway. Ash Street station closed to passengers on 1 June 1902 when all  services were transferred to a new platform on the nearby St Luke's railway station.

References

External links
 Southport Ash Street at Disused Stations

Railway stations in Great Britain opened in 1878
Railway stations in Great Britain closed in 1902
Disused railway stations in the Metropolitan Borough of Sefton
Former Lancashire and Yorkshire Railway stations
Buildings and structures in Southport